The Boyer Gallery, officially known as the Paul Boyer Museum of Animated Carvings and commonly called "The Boyer Museum", is a folk art museum located at 1205 M Street in Belleville, Kansas, United States.  It features the animated sculptures of Paul Boyer. Many of the displays are hand carved wooden pieces that have been animated with hand-built motors and mechanics, while others are working models of aircraft or tractor engines. All of the pieces were built from scratch.

The gallery was closed for several years, but was reopened in 2007 by Boyer's daughters.

External links
Paul Boyer Museum of Animated Carvings - information about the museum
SPACES: Paul Boyer, Boyer Museum of Animated Carvings
Photos of some of Boyer's works
Roadside America listing

Biographical museums in Kansas
Museums in Republic County, Kansas
Folk art museums and galleries in Kansas